Time Passages is the eighth studio album by Al Stewart, released in September 1978. It is the follow-up to his 1976 album Year of the Cat. The album, like 1975's Modern Times and 1976's Year of the Cat, was once again produced by Alan Parsons. The album's title track (which, when edited, reached #7 on the Billboard charts) and "End of the Day" were both co-written by Peter White. The title track also reached #1 on the Billboard Adult Contemporary charts for 10 weeks.

A digitally remastered version of the album was released in 2004.

Artwork
The album's front and back cover were designed by Hipgnosis. As Storm Thorgerson stated in For the Love of Vinyl: The Album Art of Hipgnosis, "For Al's Time Passages we showed a radio being tuned on the shelf of a kitchen window but at the same time "tuning" the view of the landscape outside the window". The front cover photograph was taken at Indian Route 42, Monument Valley, Arizona.

Track listing
Songs written by Al Stewart unless otherwise noted.
"Time Passages" (Al Stewart; Peter White) – 6:41
"Valentina Way"  – 4:04
"Life in Dark Water"  – 5:49
"A Man for All Seasons"  – 5:50
"Almost Lucy"  – 3:43
"The Palace of Versailles"  – 5:20
"Timeless Skies"  – 3:34
"Song on the Radio"  – 6:22
"End of the Day" (Al Stewart; Peter White) – 3:11

Historical references 
"A Man For All Seasons" refers to Sir Thomas More, statesman under Henry VIII of England (misidentified by Stewart as "Henry Plantagenet") and a Catholic martyr.
"The Palace of Versailles", the former residence of the French Kings and a key site in early days of the French Revolution. The lyrics contain specific allusions to many events and figures of the revolution.
"Life in Dark Water" – references the Mary Celeste, questioning the usage of the inaccurate term "Marie Celeste".  (Also see J. Habakuk Jephson's Statement)

Personnel
Al Stewart - guitars, keyboards, vocals
Peter White - guitars, lead guitar (tracks 1, 2 and 9), keyboards, accordion
J. Peter Robinson - grand piano, organ on "Valentina Way"
Peter Solley - synthesizer on "Palace of Versailles"
Peter Wood - keyboards, organ, piano
Tim Renwick - electric guitar, lead guitar (tracks 3, 4, 5 and 6)
Robin Lamble - bass guitar
Mark Goldenberg - rhythm guitar on "Valentina Way"
Phil Kenzie - alto saxophone on tracks 1 and 8
Stuart Elliott - drums (except track 2)
Jeff Porcaro -  drums on "Valentina Way"
Al Perkins - pedal steel guitar
Bill Linnane - guitar
Art Tripp lll, Lindsay Elliott - percussion
Brian Huddy, Joe Puerta, David Pack, James R. West, Krysia Kristianne, Jeff Borgeson - backing vocals
Andrew Powell - string arrangements

Charts

Weekly charts

Year-end charts

Certifications and sales

References

Al Stewart albums
1978 albums
Albums with cover art by Hipgnosis
Albums produced by Alan Parsons
RCA Records albums
EMI Records albums
Arista Records albums
Rhino Records albums